First Squad: The Moment of Truth ( Fāsuto sukuwaddo) is a joint animation project of Japan's Studio 4°C and Russia's Molot Entertainment. It won the Kommersant newspaper's prize.

Plot
Set during the opening days of World War II on the Eastern Front (autumn and winter of 1941/1942). Its main cast are a group of Soviet teenagers with extraordinary abilities; the teenagers have been drafted to form a special unit to fight the invading German army. They are opposed by a Schutzstaffel (SS) officer who is attempting to raise from the dead a supernatural army of crusaders from the 12th-century Order of the Sacred Cross (i.e. the Teutonic Knights) and enlist them in the Nazi cause.

Most of the teenage crew die, except for the protagonist Nadya. She is taken to a secret Soviet lab that studies supernatural phenomena, especially contacts with the dead. Nadya's task is to dive into the world of the dead for reconnaissance. There, in the Gloomy Valley, she meets her dead friends and persuades them to continue fighting.

Voice Cast

Ligalize's video clip
On the eve of May 9, 2005, a video clip was released, based on the track "Наша с тобой победа" ("Our victory") by Russian rap artist Ligalize. The clip was directed by Daisuke Nakayama, produced by Aljosha Klimov and Misha Shprits and depicted an epic fight between Soviet Pioneers and Nazi soldiers, with the German side in possession of mecha and various supernatural soldiers. Among the featured locations are the Palace of the Soviets and Mayakovskaya metro station, Moscow.

Production
In 2007, it was announced that a motion picture titled First Squad: The Moment of Truth was in the works. Film is produced by Studio 4°C and recently created for this purpose studio Molot Entertainment, distributed by Amedia. Directed by Studio 4 °C director and animator Yoshiharu Ashino, cowritten and produced by Aljosha Klimov, Misha Shprits, with Eiko Tanaka, featuring character development by Hirofumi Nakata, and music by Japanese musician DJ Krush. The film has been shown at Cannes Film Festival, Locarno Film Festival, Fantasporto and Fantasia film festival. On June 8, 2010, Anchor Bay Entertainment announced that they will distribute the film in the United States through Manga Entertainment and L.A. based XYZ Films.

References

External links
 
 
 

2009 anime films
Animated war films
Eastern Front of World War II films
Films set in 1941
Films set in 1942
Nazi zombie films
2000s speculative fiction films
Russian speculative fiction films
Japanese speculative fiction films
Russian animated films
2000s Russian-language films
Studio 4°C
Mecha anime and manga
Films set in Russia
Films set in the Soviet Union
Russian World War II films
Japanese World War II films
Films set in hell
2009 fantasy films